The 1938 Mississippi State Maroons football team represented Mississippi State College during the 1938 college football season. Spike Nelson took over as head coach after the sudden resignation of Ralph Sasse. Nelson instituted new cardinal and gold uniforms, rather than the traditional maroon and white, upsetting fans and alumni. Nelson also proved unpopular with players and was not retained after the season.

Schedule

References

Mississippi State
Mississippi State Bulldogs football seasons
Mississippi State Maroons football